The 2018 ASUN women's soccer tournament was the postseason women's soccer tournament for the ASUN Conference held from October 26 through November 3, 2018. The first round of the tournament was hosted at the #1 and #2 seed's home stadium.  Then the remaining rounds of the tournament were hosted by the higher seed.  The six-team single-elimination tournament consisted of three rounds based on seeding from regular season conference play. The Florida Gulf Coast Eagles were the defending tournament champions. However, they were unable to defend their crown, as they lost to the Lipscomb Bisons in the semifinals.  Lipscomb went on to win the tournament, beating North Alabama in the final.

Bracket
Source:

Schedule

First round

Semifinals

Final

Statistics

Goalscorers 
2 goals
 Anna Bove - North Alabama
 Olivia Doak - Lipscomb

1 Goal
 Tay Cavett - North Alabama
 Cora Duininck - Liberty
 Erin Harris - Kennesaw State
 Kyle Huey - North Alabama
 Logan McFadden - Lipscomb
 Maycie McKay - Lipscomb
 Cassidy Morgan - Florida Gulf Coast
 Evdokia Popadinvoa - Florida Gulf Goast
 Margarida Sousa - North Alabama
 Shelby Wall - North Alabama

Own Goals
 NJIT vs. North Alabama

All-Tournament team

Source:

References 

 
ASUN Women's Soccer Tournament